Magnetochromism is the term applied when a chemical compound changes colour under the influence of a magnetic field. In particular the magneto-optical effects exhibited by complex mixed metal compounds are called magnetochromic when they occur in the visible region of the spectrum. Examples include K2V3O8, lithium purple bronze Li0.9Mo6O17,  and related mixed oxides. Reported magnetochromic compounds are multiferroic manganese tungsten oxide  and multiferroic bismuth ferrite. 

Magnetically-induced color change can also occur in aqueous solutions of colloidal Fe3O4 nanoparticles that are ~10 nm in diameter. Paramagnetic Fe3O4 particles are extracted from a petroleum-based ferrofluid or synthesized in a laboratory and then suspended in water. When exposed to a strengthening magnetic field these particles organize into chains that diffract light and cause the solution to change color from a brown to red, yellow, green and then blue. Manufacturers encapsulate microscopic droplets of this solution in a thin plastic film to create a magnetochromic magnetic field viewing screen.

References

Chromism